Maude may refer to:

Places 
Maude, New South Wales, a village on the lower Murrumbidgee River in Australia
Maude, South Australia, a locality in South Australia
Maude, Victoria, a town in Australia
Cape Maude, a high ice-covered cape forming the east end of Vaughan promontory in Antarctica
Mount Maude, a peak in the Entiat Mountains, a subrange of the North Cascades, in Washington state

Other uses 
Maude (name)
Maude (TV series), a 1972–1978 CBS television situation comedy starring Beatrice Arthur
Maude Flanders (fictional), wife of Ned Flanders from The Simpsons
Maude system, implementing reflective logic and rewriting logic

See also
Harold and Maude, a 1971 cult classic movie
Matilda (disambiguation)
Maud (disambiguation)